The Beaulieu River, formerly known as the River Exe, is a small river draining much of the central New Forest in Hampshire, southern England. Unusually, the river, including its bed, is owned by Lord Montagu of Beaulieu.

Etymology 
The current name, Beaulieu is French, meaning "beautiful place". The original name, Exe, is Brythonic, deriving from the Ancient British word *Iska meaning "fishes" or "fish-place" and cognate with the modern Welsh word Pysg (fishes).This derivation applies to many similarly named rivers throughout Britain including the Axe, Exe and Usk, with the names evolving local distinctions over the centuries.

Course
The Beaulieu River rises near Lyndhurst in the centre of the New Forest, a zone where copses and scattered trees interrupt the relatively neutral sandy heath soil, however with insufficient organic uneroded deposition over millennia to prevent an upper charismatic dendritic drainage basin of many very small streams. This explains the multitude of tiny headwaters across the New Forest. Many coalesce into the flow southeast and then south across the forest heaths to the village of Beaulieu. There the river becomes tidal and once drove a tide mill in the village. The mill ceased operations in 1942. Below, the tidal river (estuary) continues to flow south-east through the Forest, passing the hamlet of Bucklers Hard and entering the Solent at Needs Ore. For its final kilometre, it is separated from The Solent by a raised salt marsh known as Gull Island.

Below Beaulieu village the river is navigable to small craft. Bucklers Hard was once a significant shipbuilding centre, building many wooden sailing ships, both merchant and naval, including Nelson's Agamemnon. Since 2000 the navigable channel at the entrance to the river has been marked by a lighthouse known as the Millennium Lighthouse or the Beaulieu River Beacon.

Tributaries
The river has two main tributaries, the Beaulieu Abbey Stream to the left and the Hatchet Stream to the right. In addition there are a series of artificial lakes near the mouth of the river, known as the Black Lagoons.

Water quality
The Environment Agency measures the water quality of the river systems in England. Each is given an overall ecological status, which may be one of five levels: high, good, moderate, poor and bad. There are several components that are used to determine this, including biological status, which looks at the quantity and varieties of invertebrates, angiosperms and fish. Chemical status, which compares the concentrations of various chemicals against known safe concentrations, is rated good or fail.

The water quality of the Beaulieu River was as follows in 2019:

Film appearances
The river was used as a backdrop for some scenes of the 1966 film A Man for All Seasons – the tree-lined waters were used to portray the 16th century River Thames.

Gallery

References

External links 

Geology of the Beaulieu River Estuary by Ian West and Yining Chen

New Forest
Beaulieu, River
Alder carrs